Lloyd Law College is a private law school in India located in Noida, Uttar Pradesh offering legal education since year 2003 in affiliation with CCS University, Meerut, U.P (state university established in 1965), and approved by the Bar Council of India (Statutory body of professional legal education in India).

Academics

Lloyd Law College is one of the colleges in India to offer conjoined degree course of B.A. and LL.B. that combine law degrees with papers in liberal arts. It offers five years integrated course in B.A LL.B and 3 years LL.B course with specialisation in different areas of law. The B.A. course is divided into ten semesters with five papers in each of the semesters. The courses are designed in such a way that it combines law degrees with papers in liberal arts in a way that is helpful for the students to cover the course in a systematic way. The three year law course follows a semester system of examination and gives specialisation in different areas of law. All the courses are approved by the Bar Council of India and are affiliated to the CCS University.

Centers Of Excellence
Lloyd Law College has been constantly focusing on Improving and Developing the professional compatibility of students.

 Lloyd Trial Advocacy Competition
 Lloyd Alternative Dispute Resolution Centre
 Internship and placement cell
 Legal Aid Center
 E-innovation 
 Lloyd - Judicial Service Preparation Center (LJSPC)
 Research Center
 International Education Center
 Forensic Science

Campus

Lloyd Law College is located in Knowledge Park - II, Greater Noida, Uttar Pradesh. The law college is spread over 4.5 acres of non-residential campus comprising three multi-storey blocks.

Infrastructure

Library
An extensive Law Library with Electronic Database in one of the key characteristics of the college. All class rooms are ICT equipped.

Moot Court Rooms
The college has two Moot Court halls with total seating capacity of 250, Fully Furnished, Air conditioned, Equipped with display boards and modern audio-video aids and eco-Free.

Seminar Hall
Lloyd has fully media equipped with LCD projector and HD Sound System. The hall is fully air-conditioned, it has a seating capacity of 300. The Hall is used for events such as moot court, Competitions, Seminars, Conference etc.

Admissions

Students are admitted to the institute through a written common test, which is generally conducted in the month of May. Apart from the score in the LET a student must have passed the 10+2 or equivalent examination in any stream with at least 45% marks with English as a compulsory subject. The students after successfully clearing the respective law entrance exams have to give a personal interview after which the candidate is selected.

Rankings 

Lloyd Law College was Ranked fourth among private law colleges in India by Outlook India in 2022.

References

External links
 Official website
 "Summer School on International Humanitarian Law - 16th June - 22nd June 2018 - @ Lloyd Law College"

Law schools in Uttar Pradesh
Universities and colleges in Noida
Educational institutions established in 2003
2003 establishments in Uttar Pradesh